The Camp Five Museum is a living history museum located in Laona, Wisconsin that interprets the forest industry and transportation history of Wisconsin.  It includes part or all of the Camp Five Farmstead, also known as Camp Five Logging Camp, which was listed on the National Register of Historic Places in 1996. The museum was established in 1969.

History

The R Connor Company established a logging camp at this site in the late 1890s, their fifth camp near Laona. By 1914, the timber within reach of the camp was exhausted, so it was converted into a company farm, to supply meat, vegetables, and work horses to Connor's other camps in the area. The site worked well because it was near town, the land in the immediate vicinity was good for farming, and it lay on a rail line. The farm continued to supply Connor's logging camps for decades. In 1969, the farm opened to the public as a history museum.

Museum
The museum site encompasses  and includes a logging and forestry museum, static displays of historic logging equipment and bateaux used in log drives, a slaughterhouse, a petting zoo, a nature center, a small cafeteria, and a museum shop. Two tours run from the site into the surrounding countryside: a forestry tour and a riverboat tour. Each tour takes about twenty minutes. Visitors reach the museum by taking the Lumberjack Steam Train, which runs on the Laona and Northern Railway.

The museum's steam train and blacksmithy are part of its daily living history displays. In addition the museum periodically hosts re-enactors of the fur-trade era, cowboys, the Civil War, and World War I.

Awards:
 1996 - Camp Five was added to the National Register of Historic Places by the US Department of the Interior
 1987 - Presidential Environmental Youth Award, from the United States Environmental Protection Agency for its education and ecology program for Boy Scouts
 1978 - Forest History Association of Wisconsin award
 1975 - Arbor Day Foundation National Award in Education for the Green Treasure Forest Tour
 1970 - Wisconsin Historical Society Award of Merit

References

External links

Railroad museums in Wisconsin
Forestry museums in the United States
Nature centers in Wisconsin
Farms on the National Register of Historic Places in Wisconsin
Museums in Forest County, Wisconsin
Natural history museums in Wisconsin
Industry museums in Wisconsin
National Register of Historic Places in Forest County, Wisconsin